Allan James McDonell (January 26, 1882 – March 31, 1957) was a Canadian politician. He served in the Legislative Assembly of British Columbia from 1945 to 1952  from the electoral district of Vancouver Centre, a member of the Coalition government.

References

1882 births
1957 deaths